Lochgelly, Cardenden and Benarty is one of the 22 wards used to elect members of the Fife council in Scotland. It elects four Councillors.

Councillors

Election Results

2022 Election
2022 Fife Council election

2017 Election
2017 Fife Council election

References

Wards of Fife
Cardenden
Lochgelly